Imelda Felicyta Ximenes Belo (born 24 October 1998) is a Timorese swimmer in freestyle and butterfly races. She competed in the women's 50 metre freestyle event at the 2020 Summer Olympics, representing East Timor.

Career
Ximenes began swimming at the age of 14 in her hometown of Baucau, when a group from FINA came to teach local children in a hotel pool. She has competed in Swimming World Championships in 2017, 2018, and 2019. In 2018 she became the first swimmer from Timor-Leste to compete at the Asian Games. She has yet to advance past the heats in international competition. During the COVID-19 pandemic, pools were closed and Ximenes instead swam in the sea until flooding outbreaks prevented this.

References

External links
 

1998 births
Living people
East Timorese female swimmers
Olympic swimmers of East Timor
Swimmers at the 2020 Summer Olympics